al-Afghani is a nisba meaning "Afghan" or from Afghanistan. It may refer to:
 Jamal al-Din al-Afghani, 19th-century political activist
 Abul Wafa Al-Afghani, Islamic scholar
 Sa'id al-Afghani, 20th-century scholar
  Dr. Muhammad Muhsin Khan Al-Afghani, Medical doctor, author, translator, and Islamic scholar
 Haroon al-Afghani, Afghan-Pakistani citizen detained by the United States
 Muhammad Rahim al-Afghani, Afghan citizen detained by the United States
 Mohammed al-Afghani, Afghan citizen detained by the United States
 Abu Dujana Al-Afghani

Surnames
Nisbas
Lists of Afghan people
Toponymic surnames
Ethnonymic surnames